Theresa Hatathlie is a Diné politician who has served as a member of the Arizona Senate from the 6th legislative district since 2023. She was appointed to the District 7 seat in 2022 after incumbent Senator Jamescita Peshlakai resigned from office. She is a member of the Democratic Party.

In addition to serving in the legislature, Hatathlie is a member of the Diné College Board of Regents, and co-founded the Navajo and Hopi Families COVID-19 Relief Fund. Hatathlie is from Coal Mine Mesa, a town in Coconino County, Arizona.

Hatathlie ran unopposed in the newly redrawn 6th District in the 2022 November election.

References

External links
 Official page at the Arizona State Legislature
 Biography at Ballotpedia

21st-century American politicians
Living people
Democratic Party Arizona state senators
Year of birth missing (living people)